Q-analysis is a mathematical framework to describe and analyze set systems, or equivalently simplicial complexes. This idea was first introduced by Ronald Atkin in the early 1970s. Atkin was a British mathematician teaching at the University of Essex. Crediting the inspiration of his idea to Clifford Dowker’s paper (Homology Groups of Relations, Annals of Mathematics, 1952), he became interested in the algebra of relations in social structures. He tried to explain his idea in both mathematical and also accessible forms to both technical and general audience. His main ideas are reflected in The Mathematical Structure of Human Affairs (1974). That book covers the key ideas in q-analysis and its application to a wide range of examples, like analyzing game of chess, urban structures, politics at university, people and complexes, works of abstract art, and to physics. He contended that q-analysis can be considered as a powerful generalized method wherever we are dealing with relationships among sets.

Description 
A simplex of  vertices can be represented as a polyhedron in  dimensions, so that for example a triangle of three vertices can be drawn on a plane of two dimensions and is accordingly called a 2-simplex. When simplices share vertices, the intersections of their vertex sets are themselves simplices of equal or lower dimension. For example, two triangles with two vertices in common share not only the two 0-simplex vertices but the 1-simplex line between them. The triangles are said to be both 1- and 0-connected because they share 1- and 0-dimensional faces.

Q-analysis of a simplicial complex consists in stepping through all  up to the dimension of the largest simplex and constructing for each  a graph of the simplices that are -connected at each level, and in particular, determining how many connected components are present for each .

Q-analysis can thus provide a rich summary of (literally) multi-faceted relationships between entities.

Applications 
 Analysis of large-scale systems structure
 Analysis of social network
 Decision making

See also 
 Systems theory
 Living systems theory

Notes

References 
 Atkin, R. (1972). From cohomology in physics to q-connectivity in social science. International Journal of Man-Machines Studies vol. 4, 139–167.
 Atkin, R. (1974). Mathematical Structure in Human Affairs. London, Heinemann.
 Atkin, R. (1976). An algebra for patterns on a complex II. International Journal of Man-Machines Studies vol. 8, 483–498.
 Atkin, R. (1977). Combinatorial Connectivities in Social Systems. Basel, Birkhäuser Verlag.

Systems theory